Calderara di Reno is a comune (municipality) in the Metropolitan City of Bologna in the Italian region Emilia-Romagna, located about  northwest of Bologna.

The frazione of Sacerno is usually considered the place where, in 43 BC, Octavian, Mark Antony and Lepidus met to set the Second Triumvirate.

References

External links
 Official website

Cities and towns in Emilia-Romagna